The 1968–69 Taça de Portugal was the 29th edition of the Portuguese football knockout tournament, organized by the Portuguese Football Federation (FPF). The 1968–69 Taça de Portugal began in September 1968. The final was played on 22 June 1969 at the Estádio Nacional.

Porto were the previous holders, having defeated Vitória de Setúbal 2–1 in the previous season's final. Defending champions Porto were unable to regain the Taça de Portugal as they were defeated in the fourth round by eventual winners Benfica, who went on to defeat Académica de Coimbra in the final and claim their thirteenth Taça de Portugal.

First round
Teams from the Segunda Divisão (II) and the Terceira Divisão (III) entered at this stage. Due to the expansion of third tier teams being able to participate in the competition, two legged first round cup ties were scrapped. First round ties which ended in a draw, were replayed at a later date.

|}

Replays

|}

Second round

|}

Replays

|}

Third round
Due to a lack of teams involved in the fourth round, the organizing body of the competition, the Portuguese Football Federation (FPF), decided to have an additional round where the teams who lost their second round ties would be given a second opportunity to progress to the next round of the competition.

|}

Replays

|}

Fourth round
Ties were played on 9 February. Teams from the Primeira Liga (I) entered at this stage.

|}

Replays

|}

Fifth round
Ties were played on 9 March. Due to the odd number of teams involved at this stage of the competition, Sporting CP qualified for the next round due to having no opponent to face at this stage of the competition.

|}

Sixth round
Ties were played between the 10–17 May. Club sides Atlético Luanda, Ferroviário Lourenço Marques, Lusitânia, União da Madeira and União de Bissau were invited to participate in the competition.

|}

Quarter-finals
Ties were played between the 25 May and the 1 June.

|}

Semi-finals
Ties were played between the 8–15 June.

|}

Final

References

Taça de Portugal seasons
1968–69 domestic association football cups
Taca